The Arapsu Bridge is a Roman bridge in Antalya, Turkey. The well-preserved footbridge lies in the Arapsuyu district, 5–6 km west to the city center, at the foot of an ancient mound which is associated with the Greek colony of Olbia.

Partly submerged by a modern weir about 100 m downstream, the exact form of its masonry arch is difficult to determine. According to George Bean, the slightly pointed arch indicates a post-ancient construction date. Colin O'Connor, however, classifies the bridge as a Roman segmental arch bridge, examples of which have survived in the neighbouring province Lycia (such as the Limyra Bridge).

See also 
 List of Roman bridges
 Ancient Roman architecture
 Ancient Roman engineering

References

Sources

External links 

Roman bridges in Turkey
Deck arch bridges
Stone bridges in Turkey
Pamphylia
Buildings and structures in Antalya Province
Arch bridges in Turkey
Pedestrian bridges in Turkey